Widad University College is a private university college in Malaysia. Situated in Kuantan, Pahang, it was previously known as University College Shahputra (UCSA). 

The institution offers undergraduate and postgraduate programs in various fields of study, including business, engineering, computer science, hospitality, and tourism. 

The institution places a strong emphasis on research and innovation. It has established research centers in various fields, including engineering, business, and hospitality.

History 
Widad University College (formerly known as University College Shahputra) began with the establishment of Institut Fitra on December 24, 1997, and was fully owned by the Shahputra Education Sdn Bhd, a private Bumiputera company. TESL and Accounting Matriculation students from UPM are among the first groups of students of the institute, registered in June 1998. Following an increase in the number of students, Institut Fitra moved to an 8 hectares area in Pekan, Pahang.

In mid-2016, University College Shahputra and Kolej Shahputra were rebranded as Widad University College and Widad College respectively.

Following this, on September 19, 2016, Seri Paduka Baginda Yang di-Pertuan Agong Tuanku Abdul Halim Mua'dzam Shah was installed as the first Chancellor of Widad University College in an inauguration ceremony held in Istana Negara, Kuala Lumpur.

Faculties 

 Faculty of Medicine
 Faculty of Business and Management
 Faculty of Education & Social Sciences
 Faculty of Nursing
 Faculty of Allied Health Sciences
 Faculty of Sport Studies

References

External links 

 Widad University College Website
 Widad Business Group

Private universities and colleges in Malaysia
Colleges in Malaysia
Universities and colleges in Pahang
Educational institutions established in 1997
1997 establishments in Malaysia